Pavel Ivanovich Zyryanov  (Russian: Павел Иванович Зырянов; 16 March 1907 – 3 January 1992) was a Soviet colonel general, who served as commander of the Soviet Border Troops from 1952 to 1956 and 1957 to 1972.

Early life
Zyryanov was born on 16 March 1907, to a family of Russian ethnicity. He graduated from a three-year parish school in Semipalatinsk in 1917. From 1919, he worked as a farm labourer. Zyryanov was appointed as secretary of a Komsomol cell in 1923.

Military career
Zyryanov joined the Red Army in September 1924. He graduated from the Omsk Infantry School Named after M.V. Frunze in 1927. From 1927 to 1934, he served in the 9th Siberian Infantry Regiment of the Joint State Political Directorate troops in Novosibirsk and became member of the Communist Party of the Soviet Union. He later served as platoon commander from September 1927 and became member of the assistant chief of staff of the regiment from June 1930. In January 1933, he was appointed as head of the regimental school.

After graduating from the Military Academy of the Red Army named after M.V. Frunze in 1937, he was requested to transfer to headquarters of the Border Troops. Zyryanov agreed, but only after receiving a command position. In September 1937, he served as the head of the 9th Komissarov (Khanka) Border Detachment of NKVD at the Far Eastern Military District.

From May 1939, he served as the Chief of Staff of the NKVD Border Troops at Primorsky Krai.

World War II
In January 1942, he was appointed as the chief of the Border Troops in Primorsky Krai, which consisted units from Ministry of State Security and NKVD. During his service in the Far East, he actively participated in operations against Japanese, Manchu and White Guard sabotage and reconnaissance groups, in continuous border skirmishes and battles.

In August 1945, during the Soviet invasion of Manchuria, he led the district border guards based in Primorsky Krai to capture and destroy Japanese border detachments and garrisons located near the Soviet border with Manchukuo, capture and hold crossings across Amur and Ussuri rivers, and conduct offensive operations together with military units in the border. All these tasks were successfully accomplished by the troops of the district with minimal combat losses.

Post war
On 20 May 1952, he was appointed as head of the main directorate of border troops of the Ministry of State Security. In March 1953, the Ministry of State Security was abolished and the border troops were transferred to the jurisdiction of the Ministry of Internal Affairs. On 12 June 1954, he became a member of the Collegium of the Ministry of Internal Affairs.

On 28 May 1956, Zyryanov was transferred to KGB under the Council of Ministers of the Soviet Union and was appointed deputy head of the 3rd Main Directorate of the KGB. From October to November 1956, he was stationed in the Hungarian People's Republic, where he took an  
active role in crushing of the Hungarian Revolution of 1956.

Zyryanov was appointed as commander of the Soviet Border Troops in April 1957, and was transferred to the KGB at the Council of Ministers of the Soviet Union. At the same time, from September 1959, he was a member of the KGB Collegium under the Council of Ministers of the USSR.

From February 1964, he was part of the Soviet delegation to China to hold negotiations on controversial border issues between Soviet Union and China. In August 1964, he was the head of Soviet delegation at the negotiations on the determination of the border on the disputed areas between the two countries. During his tenure, China and Soviet Union fought in violent border clashes near Damansky Island and Tielieketi in 1969.

The twenty-year tenure of Zyryanov as chief of the Soviet Border Troops was assessed in most modern publications as positive and reformist. Ensuring reliable protection of the state border, Zyryanov carried out the reorganization and rearmament of the troops, ensuring their equipment was at the most modern level.

He was the author of the idea of creating mobile maneuverable firing units in the most dangerous sections of the border for rapid build-up of forces in an event of a threat of violation to the border. This idea was rejected by Zyryanov's successor Vadim Matrosov, but later it was implemented during the Soviet-Afghan War.

In December 1972, he retired from military service.

Later life
After his retirement, he resided in Moscow. Zyryanov died on 3 January 1992, at the age of 84, and was buried at the Kuntsevo Cemetery in Moscow.

Awards and decorations
USSR

Foreign

Dates of rank
Captain: 1936
Major: 27 September 1937
Colonel: 31 May 1939
Major general: 3 May 1942
Lieutenant general: 15 July 1957
Colonel general: 23 February 1961

References

Bibliography

1907 births
1992 deaths
People from Semipalatinsk Oblast
Communist Party of the Soviet Union members
Soviet border guards
KGB officers
Soviet military personnel of World War II
Russian people of World War II
Recipients of the Order of Lenin
Recipients of the Order of the Red Banner
Recipients of the Order of the Red Star
Recipients of the Medal "For Distinction in Guarding the State Border of the USSR"
Frunze Military Academy alumni
Burials at Kuntsevo Cemetery
Soviet colonel generals